is a national university in Ōtsu, Shiga, Japan, founded in 1974.

Notable faculty
 Katsuo Nishiyama, professor emeritus

See also
 List of medical schools

References

External links
 Official website

Educational institutions established in 1974
Japanese national universities
Universities and colleges in Shiga Prefecture
Buildings and structures in Ōtsu
Medical schools in Japan